Frederick G. Wacker Jr. (July 10, 1918 Chicago – June 16, 1998) was an engineer and former president of two large Chicago companies.  He was also a prominent Chicago socialite, a jazz musician, and a racing driver.  He participated in five Formula One World Championship races, debuting on June 21, 1953.  He scored no championship points. He also participated in several non-Championship Formula One races.

Wacker was the grandson of Charles H. Wacker, the first chairman of the Chicago Plan Commission and the man for whom Wacker Drive in Chicago is named.  He attended The Hotchkiss School and Yale University.  He worked with AC Spark Plug before enlisting in the United States Navy.

Wacker was involved in a fatal accident during the second lap of the 1952 Watkins Glen Grand Prix, which at the time was a street course. While preparing for a right hand turn, his Allard J2 came dangerously close to a Cunningham driven by John Fitch, and both drivers swerved to avoid a collision. The back end of the Allard came out slightly to the left and closer to a throng of spectators sitting on the curb along the side of the course. Ten people were injured and a 7-year-old boy was killed. The tragedy caused the end of street racing at the Glen and elsewhere in the United States.

Complete World Championship results 
(key)

References

1918 births
1998 deaths
Hotchkiss School alumni
Yale University alumni
United States Navy personnel of World War II
United States Navy officers
Businesspeople from Chicago
American Formula One drivers
Gordini Formula One drivers
24 Hours of Le Mans drivers
Racing drivers from Chicago
Sports deaths in New York (state)
World Sportscar Championship drivers
20th-century American businesspeople
People from Lake Bluff, Illinois
Military personnel from Chicago